Amy Edmonds (born November 9, 1970) is an American politician and a former Republican member of the Wyoming House of Representatives, having represented District 12 from January 9, 2007, until January 8, 2013.  She is the wife of former Representative Harlan Edmonds.

She is a former Communications Director for Congresswoman Liz Cheney.

References

External links
Official page at the Wyoming Legislature
Profile from Ballotpedia

Living people
Republican Party members of the Wyoming House of Representatives
University of Wyoming alumni
People from Burke, South Dakota
Politicians from Cheyenne, Wyoming
American Presbyterians
1970 births